The Best of Bread, Volume 2 is a 1974 compilation album by the band Bread.

Track listing 
All songs written by David Gates except as noted.

LP Side A
 "Sweet Surrender" – 2:35
 "Fancy Dancer" (Botts, Griffin) – 3:31
 "The Guitar Man" – 3:55
 "Been Too Long on the Road" – 4:49
 "Friends and Lovers" (Griffin, Royer) – 3:51
 "Aubrey" – 3:38

LP Side B
 "Daughter" – 3:21
 "Dream Lady" (Griffin, Royer) – 3:23
 "Yours for Life" – 3:20
 "Just Like Yesterday" (Griffin) – 2:35
 "He's a Good Lad" – 2:57
 "London Bridge" – 2:30

Tracks A1, A3, A5, A6, B1 and B5 are also included on the Rhino CD re-issue of 1973's The Best of Bread.

References 

 Elektra 7E-1005
 Allmusic.com review (link)

Bread (band) compilation albums
1974 greatest hits albums
Elektra Records compilation albums